Jeon Chan-sik (born 14 February 1971) is a South Korean sport shooter who competed in the 2000 Summer Olympics. He tied for 23rd place in the men's skeet event.

References

1971 births
Living people
South Korean male sport shooters
Skeet shooters
Olympic shooters of South Korea
Shooters at the 2000 Summer Olympics
Shooters at the 1990 Asian Games
Shooters at the 2002 Asian Games
Shooters at the 2010 Asian Games
Asian Games medalists in shooting
Asian Games silver medalists for South Korea
Medalists at the 1990 Asian Games
20th-century South Korean people
21st-century South Korean people